Scandale is a town and comune in the province of Crotone, in the Calabria region of southern Italy.

Geography
The town is bordered by Crotone, Cutro, Rocca di Neto, San Mauro Marchesato and Santa Severina.

Notes and references

Cities and towns in Calabria